In mathematics, a linear form (also known as a linear functional, a one-form, or a covector) is a linear map from a vector space to its field of scalars (often, the real numbers or the complex numbers).

Examples 

The constant zero function, mapping every vector to zero, is trivially a linear functional. Every other linear functional (such as the ones below) is surjective (that is, its range is all of ).
 Mean: The mean element of an -vector is given by the one-form  That is, 
 Sampling: Sampling with a kernel can be considered a one-form, where the one-form is the kernel shifted to the appropriate location.
 Net present value of a net cash flow,  is given by the one-form  where  is the discount rate. That is,

Linear functionals in Rn 
Suppose that vectors in the real coordinate space  are represented as column vectors

For each row vector  there is a linear functional  defined by

and each linear functional can be expressed in this form.

This can be interpreted as either the matrix product or the dot product of the row vector  and the column vector :

Trace of a square matrix 
The trace  of a square matrix  is the sum of all elements on its main diagonal. Matrices can be multiplied by scalars and two matrices of the same dimension can be added together; these operations make a vector space from the set of all  matrices.

(Definite) Integration 
Linear functionals first appeared in functional analysis, the study of vector spaces of functions. A typical example of a linear functional is integration: the linear transformation defined by the Riemann integral

is a linear functional from the vector space  of continuous functions on the interval  to the real numbers. The linearity of  follows from the standard facts about the integral:

Evaluation 
Let  denote the vector space of real-valued polynomial functions of degree  defined on an interval  If  then let  be the evaluation functional

The mapping  is linear since

Non-example 
It is, however, affine-linear.

Visualization 

In finite dimensions, a linear functional can be visualized in terms of its level sets, the sets of vectors which map to a given value. In three dimensions, the level sets of a linear functional are a family of mutually parallel planes; in higher dimensions, they are parallel hyperplanes.

Applications

Application to quadrature 
In symbols, there are coefficients  for which

for all  This forms the foundation of the theory of numerical quadrature.

In quantum mechanics 
Linear functionals are particularly important in quantum mechanics. Quantum mechanical systems are represented by Hilbert spaces, which are anti–isomorphic to their own dual spaces. A state of a quantum mechanical system can be identified with a linear functional. For more information see bra–ket notation.

Distributions 
In the theory of generalized functions, certain kinds of generalized functions called distributions can be realized as linear functionals on spaces of test functions.

Dual vectors and bilinear forms

Every non-degenerate bilinear form on a finite-dimensional vector space  induces an isomorphism  such that 

for all 

The above defined vector  is said to be the dual vector of  

In an infinite dimensional Hilbert space, analogous results hold by the Riesz representation theorem. There is a mapping  from  into its  V.

Relationship to bases

Basis of the dual space
Let the vector space  have a basis , not necessarily orthogonal. Then the dual space  has a basis  called the dual basis defined by the special property that

Or, more succinctly,

where δ is the Kronecker delta. Here the superscripts of the basis functionals are not exponents but are instead contravariant indices.

A linear functional  belonging to the dual space  can be expressed as a linear combination of basis functionals, with coefficients ("components") ,

Then, applying the functional  to a basis vector  yields

due to linearity of scalar multiples of functionals and pointwise linearity of sums of functionals. Then

So each component of a linear functional can be extracted by applying the functional to the corresponding basis vector.

The dual basis and inner product 
When the space  carries an inner product, then it is possible to write explicitly a formula for the dual basis of a given basis. Let  have (not necessarily orthogonal) basis  In three dimensions, the dual basis can be written explicitly

In higher dimensions, this generalizes as follows

where  is the Hodge star operator.

Over a ring 
Modules over a ring are generalizations of vector spaces, which removes the restriction that coefficients belong to a field. The space of linear forms is always denoted , whether  is a field or not. It is an right module, if  is a left module.

The existence of "enough" linear forms on a module is equivalent to projectivity.

Change of field 

Real versus complex linear functionals 

Real and imaginary parts 

The fact that  for all  implies that for all  

and consequently, that  and  

The assignment  defines a bijective -linear operator  whose inverse is the map  defined by the assignment  that sends  to the linear functional  defined by

Similarly for the imaginary part, the assignment  induces an -linear bijection  whose inverse is the map  defined by sending  to the linear functional on  defined by  

This relationship was discovered by Henry Löwig in 1934 (although it is usually credited to F. Murray), and can be generalized to arbitrary finite extensions of a field in the natural way. It has many important consequences, some of which will now be described.

Properties and relationships 

Then  if and only if  if and only if  

Assume that  is a topological vector space. Then  is continuous if and only if its real part  is continuous, if and only if 's imaginary part  is continuous. This remains true if the word "continuous" is replaced with the word "bounded". In particular,  if and only if  where the prime denotes the space's continuous dual space.

Let  If  for all scalars  of unit length (meaning ) then  
Similarly, if  denotes the complex part of  then  implies  
This conclusion extends to the analogous statement for polars of balanced sets in general topological vector spaces.

In infinite dimensions 
Below, all vector spaces are over either the real numbers  or the complex numbers  

If  is a topological vector space, the space of continuous linear functionals — the  — is often simply called the dual space. If  is a Banach space, then so is its (continuous) dual. In finite dimensions, every linear functional is continuous, so the continuous dual is the same as the algebraic dual, but in infinite dimensions the continuous dual is a proper subspace of the algebraic dual.

A linear functional  on a (not necessarily locally convex) topological vector space  is continuous if and only if there exists a continuous seminorm  on  such that

Characterizing closed subspaces 
Continuous linear functionals have nice properties for analysis: a linear functional is continuous if and only if its kernel is closed, and a non-trivial continuous linear functional is an open map, even if the (topological) vector space is not complete.

Hyperplanes and maximal subspaces 

Relationships between multiple linear functionals 

Any two linear functionals with the same kernel are proportional (i.e. scalar multiples of each other). 
This fact can be generalized to the following theorem. 

Hahn–Banach theorem 

Any (algebraic) linear functional on a vector subspace can be extended to the whole space; for example, the evaluation functionals described above can be extended to the vector space of polynomials on all of   However, this extension cannot always be done while keeping the linear functional continuous. The Hahn–Banach family of theorems gives conditions under which this extension can be done.  For example,

Equicontinuity of families of linear functionals 
Let  be a topological vector space (TVS) with continuous dual space  

For any subset  of  the following are equivalent: 
  is equicontinuous;

If  is an equicontinuous subset of  then the following sets are also equicontinuous: 
the weak-* closure, the balanced hull, the convex hull, and the convex balanced hull. 

See also

Notes

Footnotes

Proofs

References

Bibliography 

 

  
  

 
 
  
  
  
 
  

  

Functional analysis
Linear algebra
Linear operators
Linear functionals